The Bernard H.V.41 was a racing seaplane designed by Société des Avions Bernard for the French government to compete in the 1929 Schneider Trophy.

Design and development
The H.V.41 and H.V.40 were two designs ordered for use by the French team in the 1929 Schneider Trophy. Although the H.V.40 was to be powered by a radial engine, the H.V.41 was to use a new liquid-cooled Hispano-Suiza 12Ns Special. It was a streamlined single-seat cantilever monoplane and had two metal floats attached underneath the fuselage on inverted vee-struts. The H.V.41 was ready for testing by July 1929 but due to delays with the engine it did not fly until August and the French government withdrew the team from the 1929 race. The aircraft was then used for training by the French Schneider Trophy team.

Specifications

See also

References

Notes

Bibliography

1920s French sport aircraft
Schneider Trophy
Floatplanes
HV041
Single-engined tractor aircraft
Low-wing aircraft
Aircraft first flown in 1929